The 2018−19 Bulgarian Cup was the 37th official edition of the Bulgarian annual football knockout tournament. The competition began on 25 September 2018 with the first round and finished with the final on 15 May 2019. Slavia Sofia were the defending champions, but lost on penalties in the round of 16 to Ludogorets Razgrad. The final was contested between Lokomotiv Plovdiv and Botev Plovdiv, thus being the first ever final to feature the Plovdiv derby. Lokomotiv won the final with the score of 1–0 and clinched their first ever cup title. They also qualified for the second qualifying round of the 2019–20 UEFA Europa League.

Participating clubs
The following 32 teams qualified for the competition:

Matches

Round of 32
The draw was conducted on 29 August 2018. The games will be played between 25 and 27 September 2018. In this stage all of the participants started their participation i.e. the 14 teams from First League, the 15 non-reserve teams from Second League and the 3 winners from the regional amateur competitions.

Round of 16
The draw was conducted on 28 September 2018. The games will be played between 30 October and 1 November 2018. In this stage the participants will be the 16 winners from the first round.

Quarter-finals
The draw was conducted on 7 November 2018. The games will be played on 2, 3 and 4 April 2019. In this stage the participants will be the 8 winners from the second round.

Semi-finals
The draw was conducted on 4 April 2019, immediately after the conclusion of the quarter-finals. The first legs will be played on 16 and 17 April, while the second legs are scheduled for 23 and 24 April 2019.

First legs

Second legs

Final

The final took place at the Vasil Levski National Stadium in Sofia on May 15, 2019.

Bracket

Top goalscorers

Notes

References

Bulgarian Cup seasons
Bulgarian Cup
Cup